is a passenger railway station  located in the town of Yazu, Yazu District, Tottori Prefecture, Japan.. It is operated by the West Japan Railway Company (JR West).

Lines
Only local trains stop at this station.

Station layout
The station consists of one ground-level side platform serving a single bi-directional track.  It used to have an island platform with two tracks on one side, but the track on one side has been removed. The wooden station building remains, and is connected to the platform by a level crossing. The station is unattended.

History
Kawahara Station opened on December 20, 1919.  With the privatization of the Japan National Railways (JNR) on April 1, 1987, the station came under the aegis of the West Japan Railway Company.

Passenger statistics
In fiscal 2018, the station was used by an average of 79 passengers daily.

Surrounding area
Tottori Prefectural Road No. 32 Gunke Kano Keko Line
Tottori Prefectural Road 229 Yoneokagawara Station Line

See also
List of railway stations in Japan

References

External links 

 Kawahara Station from JR-Odekake.net 

Railway stations in Tottori Prefecture
Railway stations in Japan opened in 1919
Yazu, Tottori